Mafana is a genus of moths of the family Erebidae. The genus was described by Viette in 1979.

Species
Mafana lajonquierei Viette, 1979 Madagascar
Mafana lemairei Viette, 1979 Madagascar

References

Calpinae